Distribution America was a hardware store retailers' cooperative with 15000 affiliated retail locations.

Its programs included the well known Sentry Hardware, Trustworthy Hardware, and Golden Rule Lumber Center brands.

On April 1st, 2022, Distribution America merged with PRO Group to form Hardlines Distribution Alliance (HDA).

Members 
 Blish-Mize
 Emery-Waterhouse
 Florida Hardware
 Handy Hardware
 HDW, Inc
 House-Hasson Hardware
 Jensen Distribution Services
 Monroe Hardware
 United Hardware

Competitors 
 Val-Test Distributors
 Reliable Distributors
 Associated Building Materials Distributors

References

External links 
 Distribution America

Cooperatives in the United States
Hardware stores of the United States